Sungei Jurong (also known as the Jurong River) is a river in Jurong East, Singapore.

The Jurong River subzone runs across this river. The subzone is bounded by the Ayer Rajah Expressway, Jurong Port Road, Jalan Buroh and Penjuru Road.

References

Jurong East
Rivers of Singapore